The Princess Hotel Sofia is a 4-star hotel in Sofia, Bulgaria. It has 601 hotel rooms, a luxury lobby bar and a restaurant. The hotel is located near the Central Bus Station and the Central Railway Station

External links
The hotel's website

See also
List of tallest buildings in Sofia

Hotels in Sofia
Hotel buildings completed in 1977